Luhrig is an unincorporated community in Athens County, in the U.S. state of Ohio.

History
A post office called Luhrig was established in 1900, and was discontinued in 1916. Luhrig originally was a mining community; the Luhrig Coal Company operated coal mines there.

References

Unincorporated communities in Athens County, Ohio
1900 establishments in Ohio
Unincorporated communities in Ohio